Livia Kaiser (born 2 October 2004) is a Swiss figure skater. She is the 2023 Swiss national champion, the 2021 Volvo Open Cup silver medalist, and finished 18th at the 2023 European Figure Skating Championships.

Personal life 
Kaiser was born on 2 October 2004 in Frauenfeld, Switzerland. She aspires to become either a veterinarian or a figure skating coach.

Career

Early years 
Kaiser became inspired to take up figure skating at age seven after watching countrywoman Sarah Meier win the 2011 European Figure Skating Championships.

Programs

Competitive highlights 
CS: Challenger Series; JGP: Junior Grand Prix.

References

External links 
 

2004 births
Living people
People from Frauenfeld
Swiss female single skaters
21st-century Swiss women